Jeltje van Nieuwenhoven (born 2 August 1943) is a retired Dutch politician of the Labour Party (PvdA) and librarian.

Biography

Before entering politics
Jeltje van Nieuwenhoven was born in Noordwolde in the Frisian municipality of Weststellingwerf. Her father was a carpenter. She went to a public elementary school in Noordwolde. After obtaining her MULO, specialising in the arts, she studied to become librarian. Between 1960 and 1979, she was librarian. First for the local library in Wolvega and the provincial library of Friesland, but in 1966 she began to work at the Institute for the History of Art of the University of Utrecht. In the meantime, she had become a member of the PvdA. In 1974, she became librarian at the scientific foundation of the PvdA, the Wiardi Beckman Foundation. She also became treasurer of the Vinkeveen branch of the party. In 1976, she joined the political working group of the women's movement within the PvdA, the Red Women (Rooie Vrouwen). In 1978, she was elected to the local legislative in Vinkeveen and she immediately became a member of the local executive. In 1979 she became personal assistant to the chairman of the PvdA, Max van den Berg.

Political life
In the 1981 elections, Van Nieuwenhoven was elected into the House of Representatives. In the 1982 election Van Nieuwenhoven was not elected, having been placed in an ineligible position. Instead she joined the PvdA board. In 1983 she entered parliament however because a member of the PvdA resigned from parliament She would remain a member of parliament until 2004.

As member of parliament she held several positions within the party: in the period 1990–96 she was a member of the Curatorium of the Wiardi Beckman Foundation, where she had been librarian; between 1997 and 2001 she served on the party board. 
In 1995 she was made a Knight of the Order of the Dutch Lion.

In parliament she showed a particular interest the Netherlands Public Broadcasting, media and culture, and was the party's spokesperson on these matters. Belonging to the left wing of the PvdA, she is known for her ardent feminism. In 1985 she voted, against the majority of her parliamentary party, for the Beckers motion which would have removed all nuclear weapons from the Netherlands and in 1997 she voted for the Rouvoet motion to allow the Gümüs family to remain in the Netherlands, once more against the majority of her parliamentary party. Both motions failed. She was chairperson of the committee for Women's emancipation between 1989 and 1994 and of the committee for Health, Welfare and Sports between 1994 and 1998.

As a prominent member of parliament, Van Nieuwenhoven held several positions within the world of the arts. She was on the board of the foundation for the Festival of Stories in Amsterdam, between 1989 and 1994. She was chairperson of the board of the Combined Theaters in Amsterdam between 1992 and 2002. She also sat on the board of the Amstel Foundation for Youth Theatre in the same period. Furthermore, she was a member of the board of the Dutch Film Festival and chaired that of the VSB Poetry Prize.

In 1998, she was elected Speaker of the House of Representatives, becoming the first woman to have this function. In 2002 she did not stand for reelection and instead became chairperson ad interim of her own parliamentary party, which was a considerable crisis, after losing the elections. In November 2002 she stood for election of chairperson and top candidate for her own party, but was convincingly beaten by Wouter Bos. Van Nieuwenhoven came second (with a 30% margin) and was second candidate and first woman on the PvdA list. She became the vice-chair of the parliamentary party, responsible for internal affairs.

Retirement from politics and subsequent return
In 2004 she left parliament to become a member of the provincial executive of South Holland. In 2006 she resigned from this post for health reasons. In 2005 she was rewarded with the Golden Pin of the PvdA, which had previously been given only to Joop den Uyl and Max van der Stoel. She currently chairs the committee that will select and assess prospective parliamentary candidates for the PvdA. Van Nieuwenhoven still holds several functions in the Dutch arts world: she is chairperson of the National Theatre, a member of the academy for the Golden Goosefeather (an art prize), and of the advisory board of the Institut Néerlandais and the Kröller-Müller Museum. In October 2009, she came back from retirement to become candidate for the PvdA leadership in The Hague. On 23 October she was confirmed to lead the PvdA into The Hague local election in 2010.

Electoral history

Decorations

References

External links

Official
  J. (Jeltje) van Nieuwenhoven Parlement & Politiek

 

1943 births
Living people
Commanders of the Order of Orange-Nassau
Dames Grand Cross of the Order of Isabella the Catholic
Dutch art historians
Dutch librarians
Dutch nonprofit directors
Knights of the Order of the Netherlands Lion
Members of the House of Representatives (Netherlands)
Members of the Provincial Council of South Holland
Members of the Provincial-Executive of South Holland
Municipal councillors of The Hague
Municipal councillors in Utrecht (province)
People from De Ronde Venen
Labour Party (Netherlands) politicians
Speakers of the House of Representatives (Netherlands)
People from Weststellingwerf
Women librarians
20th-century Dutch civil servants
20th-century Dutch women politicians
20th-century Dutch politicians
21st-century Dutch civil servants
21st-century Dutch women politicians
21st-century Dutch politicians
Women legislative speakers